Alexander Garden Fraser (6 October 1873 – 27 January 1962), was a British educator and Anglican vicar. He was one of the founders of Achimota School and the first principal of the school (1924–1935). The other founders were Sir Frederick Gordon Guggisberg, former Governor of the Gold Coast (1919–1927), and Dr. James Emman Kwegyir Aggrey, the first assistant vice principal (1924–1927).

Trinity College, Kandy, Sri Lanka (formerly Ceylon)
Alexander Garden Fraser was born in Tillicoultry in Clackmannanshire on 6 October 1873, the eldest son of Sir Andrew Henderson Leith Fraser (1848-1919), later Lieutenant-Governor of Bengal, and his first wife Agnes Whitehead née Archibald ( -1879). He was named after his paternal grandfather Rev Prof Alexander Garden Fraser DD (1814-1904) a New York born minister who joined the Free Church of Scotland and spent most of his life teaching in India.

Educated at Merchiston Castle School in Edinburgh, and Trinity College, Oxford, he initially intended to study law, but became involved with the Student Volunteer Missionary Union. He was ordained and eventually became a renowned educationist and missionary. Prior to joining Achimota School, he was the principal of the Trinity College, Ceylon, for the 20-year period from 1904 to 1924. Fraser is described as the greatest principal of Trinity College. To quote, 
“Rev. A.G. Fraser brought the school from a mere provincial school to a national college. In his day (1904–1924), Trinity College became a multi-faceted educational institution, equal to that of any leading school in the British Commonwealth. In the days of Fraser, 17 different nationalities made use of the all-round education Trinity provided. He was an inspiring personality and yet truly self-sacrificing. All his best years were given to Trinity and all his efforts bore fruit. He had the power of persuasion, which he used to inspire brilliant men from Oxford and Cambridge to serve as Anglican missionaries at Trinity College. The decisions of Mr. Fraser were daring but far sighted. It was he who introduced the mother tongue and broke away from conventional subjects mostly imported from England. He introduced a diversified system of education with a strong bias towards national needs. Agriculture was introduced when it was not the practice in any other local school."

Fraser and the then vice principal of Trinity College are credited for the College Chapel's open design. The design is similar to Achimota's Aggrey Memorial Chapel which is also an open chapel.

The principal of Trinity College, Rev. A. G. Fraser, took the school from a mere provincial school to a national college. It was in his day that Trinity became the multi-faceted educational institution it is today. Since then, students from over 17 different nations have made use of the all round education provided at Trinity. Fraser was an inspiring personality and yet truly self-sacrificing. All his best years were given to Trinity and all his efforts bore fruit. He had the power of persuasion, which he used to inspire brilliant men from Oxford and Cambridge Universities to serve as Anglican missionaries at Trinity College. Walter Senior was one such person who came to serve as Vice Principal under Fraser. He is best known as the Bard of Lanka. The decisions of Mr. Fraser were daring but far sighted. It was he who introduced the mother tongue and broke away from conventional subjects mostly imported from England. He introduced a diversified system of education with a strong bias towards national needs. Trinity was the first school in Ceylon to introduce Sinhala language into its curriculum. Agriculture was introduced when it was not the practice in any other local school. The story of Fraser is voluminous, for he was not merely a principal but a stalwart among head masters. He had on his staff a brilliant man Gaster, who was responsible for planning the buildings of the time. Two buildings, one known as the "Gaster Block" and the other was the Chapel which continues to be admired today and bears testimony to the wisdom of Fraser and Gaster. The chapel is unique among churches in Sri Lanka. Architecturally one could see the best of Sinhala Architecture, with designs and carvings similar to those one could see in Polonnaruwa, an ancient capital of Sri Lanka. It was the first open chapel in the world, when all the others were of gothic type. During his years as Principal, Mr. Fraser obtained a lease of a land from the Asgiriya Temple and levelled it to create a playing field, which was later to become the Asgiriya Stadium. In his time the school games brought much honour and glory to the school from the innumerable victories in Cricket and Rugby. Rev. Fraser left in 1924 to head a school in Gold Coast, namely Achimota School, the great college of that country.

Achimota College and School
In 1924, the Gold Coast colonial government approved the funding for the proposed Prince of Wales College and School, now known as "Achimota School", as part of Governor Guggisberg's education reform program for the Gold Coast.

Apparently, Rev. Fraser and Dr. Aggrey first met in January 1924 at the home of Dr. J. H. Oldham at Chipstead in Surrey, United Kingdom.
"Oldham recalled his conversation with Aggrey on the proposed Achimota College: "We started discussing people, and I sounded Aggrey on the names of several people who had been mentioned as possible Headmasters. He shook his head in each case. Then I said to him, 'Would you go with Fraser?' He said 'Oh yes, I'd go with Fraser!' I said 'What in the world do you know about Fraser that makes you so confident about him when you have been so doubtful about all the other people?' He said 'Don't you remember that four years ago we lunched at a restaurant in Soho, Mr. and Mrs. Fraser and you and your wife, before going to a matinée?' And I said, 'Do you mean to tell me, Aggrey, that on the strength of a lunch four years ago, you are absolutely clear that you would go with Fraser?' 'Yes,' he said; 'absolutely clear.' 'All right!' I said; and I went into the other room where the telephone was. Alek was at Oxford, and I wired, 'Can you come for the week-end to meet Aggrey?' And he did. He came on the Saturday, and they went out for a walk on the Sunday afternoon; and they came back to say they would go.""

Fraser left his position as Principal of the Trinity College, Ceylon, and accepted the position as Achimota School's first principal. He and Aggrey, the School's first vice principal, supervised the construction and equipping of Achimota School. Fraser and the other founders made personal sacrifices to realise their dream of the first co-educational institution in the Gold Coast. They battled racism and harsh, and often unfounded, criticism. "To prepare Achimota School for its opening, Rev. Fraser and Dr. Aggrey hammered nails when they required hammering; they scrubbed floors and washed windows."

Classes commenced at Achimota School on 27 February 1926, then known as the "Prince of Wales College and School" and it was formally opened by the Governor, Sir Guggisberg, on 28 January 1927.

When Aggrey died in the United States on 30 July 1927, Fraser wrote: 
'Williams could fill my place. No one can fill Aggrey's. It was he who persuaded me to go to Achimota in the first place, and I made it a condition of my going that he should come with me and help me to know the people and their outlook. He came at pecuniary loss, to begin with, and nobly he did his special work. He had marvellous power over people. It was not only his great oratorial gifts and sparkling kindly humour, but it was his transparent sincerity, his intense belief in them, his ardent love of Africa, and his flaming purity ... I have often been asked if Aggrey was worth it. If Achimota has caught the imagination of West Africa today, and I believe it has, it is due to Aggrey more than any other six men ... In Achimota we lose more than we can yet understand. But of the many good things I have been freely given in life, one of the best is the intimate friendship given me by Aggrey'.

Legacy
At Achimota School, Fraser and his staff, including Aggrey, shared the belief that Africans should not be turned into pseudo-Europeans but taught to retain the highest values of their own culture. This is reflected in the "Ideals Upon Which Achimota Was Founded". Fraser composed the school hymn that also embodies Achimota ideals.

Family and memorials
“Fraser House", a boys’ residence hall that is now part of the secondary department was named in Fraser's honour. In addition, "Fraser Building" at Trinity College, Kandy, Sri Lanka is named after him. His sons Alistair Garden (Sandy) and Andrew (his younger brother) both taught at Achimota for many years. Fraser was survived by his grandson, Prof. Ian Fraser, a retired art professor, and other grandchildren. Prof. Fraser and other family members now live in the United States.

Notes

He also had a daughter, Alison, after whom he named the school's Alison House. She is survived by her daughter (her two sons having predeceased her) and nine grandchildren. All resident in the United Kingdom.

Sources
 Aggrey, J.E.K. and Fraser, A.G.; Cambridge University Library: Royal Commonwealth Society Library, Y30448S
 Brief History of Trinity College
 Brody, Donal; "Permission granted by Dr. Brody", Great Epics Newsletter, Great Epic Books. (Summarized from the websites listed below.)
 Ghana Educational History
 Great Epic Books June 1998
 Great Epic Books July 1998
 Janus
 Lucy
 OAA 1973
 Ward, William Ernest Frank (1965), Fraser of Trinity and Achimota, Accra: Ghana Universities Press.

1873 births
1962 deaths
People educated at Merchiston Castle School
Heads of schools in Sri Lanka
Heads of schools in Ghana
Commanders of the Order of the British Empire